The Special Intervention Group (GIS) is a special forces group created in Algeria in 1987, initially with 400 members.

History 
Since 1992, GIS forces have operated within the context of violent confrontation between the Algerian government and Islamic militants; major human rights violations against civilians have been alleged against both sides. A resulting arms embargo against Algeria initially prevented the GIS from obtaining equipment such as night-vision goggles typical for such units. However, after the September 11, 2001 attacks, western matériel vendors were allowed to sell equipment to Algeria in the name of the international War on Terrorism.

Responsibility and training
A sub-unit of the Départment du Renseignement et de la Sécurité (DRS), it is responsible for counter-terrorism.  It is based in Algiers and has a base at Blida, 50 km (31 miles) from Algiers. The Grouping of special intervention (GIS) made several elaborate training courses in various domains (assault, sniping, aircraft, bomb squad) to the Officers' training school of the special troops ( EATS) in Algeria, without forgetting the training in the highly rated of the groups Alpha of Russia. The men of the GIS are trained in the Japanese martial arts Ju-Jitsu and the Korean martial arts Kuk Sool Won, but in a purely military aspect.

Firearms
 Assault rifle
 AKM
 Steyr AUG
 Heckler and Koch G36

Machine guns
 PKM machine gun

SMG
 Beretta M12
 Heckler & Koch MP5
 Heckler & Koch MP7

Sniper rifle
 Dragunov sniper rifle
 Remington 700

Shotguns
 Franchi SPAS-12

Pistols
 Glock 17
 Beretta 92
 Beretta 93R
 Browning Hi Power
 Caracal pistol

References

Military counterterrorist organizations
Special forces of Algeria
Terrorism in Algeria
Military units and formations established in 1987
1987 establishments in Algeria
Military units and formations disestablished in 2016
2010s disestablishments in Algeria